The 2012 MSA British Rally Championship was the 54th season of the British Rally Championship. The season began on 24 February in Bournemouth and ended on 29 September in Yorkshire.

Season Summary
The 2012 season will start without a defending champion as last years winner David Bogie announced in February that he will not contest the BRC series this year. Instead he intends to concentrate on the Scottish Rally Championship.

Calendar
The 2012 calendar consists of six rounds.

Drivers championship standings

Points are awarded to the highest placed registered driver on each event as follows: 20, 18, 16, 15, and so on deleting one point per placing down to one single point for all finishers.

References

External links
Official Website

British Rally Championship seasons
Rally Championship
British Rally Championship